Kate Swaffer (born 1958) is a campaigner for the rights of people with dementia and older persons globally, and for dementia to be managed as a disability, to ensure equal access to the Convention on the Rights of Persons with Disabilities (CRPD). She was awarded Australian of the Year for South Australia in 2017, and the 2018 winner of the Global Leader, AFR 100 Women of Influence in Australia.

Early life
Swaffer was born in a farming community on Eyre Peninsula in 1958. She is married, and has two sons. Her first career was nursing, having worked in dementia and aged care and then operating theatres; she is also a retired chef having run her own hospitality businesses for ten years. She subsequently worked in health care sales.

Swaffer was diagnosed with dementia shortly before her 50th birthday in 2008. Subsequently, she completed a Bachelor of Arts in Writing and Creative Communication and a Bachelor of Psychology. She has completed a Master of Science in Dementia Care (2014). Swaffer is currently enrolled at the University of South Australia to complete her PhD.

Activism and advocacy
Swaffer is one of eight co founders of Dementia Alliance International, a global advocacy and support group for people living with dementia which was launched on 1 January 2014.

She is the only Australian to have been a full member of the World Dementia Council and is a past  elected board member of Alzheimer's Disease International, serving her second term. Her PhD candidature which first commenced at the University of Wollongong and was then transferred to the University of South Australia focuses on dementia and human rights (currently in progress; her past and current work is available on ORCID. She is an Honorary Associate Fellow with the Faculty of Science, Medicine and Health, University of Wollongong, a past Fellow of The Royal Society for Arts, Manufactures and Commerce (RSA), and an International Fellow at the University of East Anglia. Swaffer completed a Master of Science in Dementia Care at the University of Wollongong in 2014.

In her human rights work, Swaffer is the first person living with a diagnosis of dementia to give an invited keynote speech at an agency of the United Nations, the World Health Organization (WHO), at the First Ministerial Conference on Dementia in March 2015, where she demanded human rights, access to the Convention on the Rights of Persons with Disabilities (CRPD) for all people with dementia, and a balance in research between care and cure on the global stage. These demands were included in the WHO Final Call To Action, and human rights were included in the Global action plan on the public health response to dementia 2017–2025, adopted at the World Health Assembly in May 2017.

Swaffer is a campaigner for human rights in aged and dementia care, for dementia to be managed as a condition causing disabilities, and for social justice for all, and still volunteers for the homeless in South Australia, and the Bereaved Through Suicide Support Group (SA) Incorporated.

Swaffer is an academic, author and poet. Her books on dementia were released in 2016. Swaffer's first two volumes of poetry were published in 2012 and 2016.

Swaffer has been instrumental in bringing human rights to the fore in dementia and aged care, including recognition in practice for dementia being recognised as a disability through published articles and books, presentations and global campaigning. Since 2010, she has given more than 1000 invited presentations in the fields of dementia and human rights, disAbility, discrimination, stigma, dementia-enabling design principles, language, Inclusive Communities, Prescribed Disengagement®, Models of care, Information Technology, Advocacy and Activism, dementia policy (local, national and global) and loss and grief.

Education 
PhD Candidate, University of South Australia, School of Justice and Society (current)
PhD Candidate, University of Wollongong (2016 FT, then LoA, 2017- July 18)
Master of Science, Dementia, (Distinction), University of Wollongong, 2014
Bachelor of Psychology, University of South Australia, 2010
Bachelor of Arts, Writing and Creative Communication, University of South Australia, 2009
Certificate of Small Business Management, Business SA, 2005
Graduate Diploma in Grief Counselling, University of Ballarat, 1989
Chef Diploma: “Australian Cuisine with Cheong Liew”, Regency Park TAFE, 1987
Nurses training, Whyalla Hospital and Cleve District Hospital, SA, 1975-1977

Awards and honours 
Alumni Award, University of South Australia 2021
Ambassador, StepUp4DementiaResearch, Australia, 2019 - current
Winner, Global Leader, AFR/Qantas 100 Women of Influence, 2018
Winner, Australian of The Year, South Australia, 2017
SA Parliamentary Motion (60) by the Hon Kelly Vincent MLC, 2017, unanimously accepted recognising her local, national and global work in dementia
The Sir Keith Wilson Oration, Australian Gerontology Association (AAG) SA, 2017
Listed in the Who's Who in Australia, annually since 2016
Winner, Alumni Award Social Impact Award University of Wollongong, 2016
Finalist, Social Impact, Westpac/AFR 100 Women of Influence, 2016
Finalist, Australian of The Year Award, South Australian, 2016 
Winner, National Disability Awards: Emerging Leader in Disability Awareness in Australia, 2015
Inaugural Winner, Dementia Leader, University of Stirling International Dementia Awards, 2015 
Inaugural winner, Dignity in Care Achievement Award, Outstanding Individual Contribution to Dignity in Care, 2015
Winner, Bethanie Education Medallion Award, 2015
Winner, University of Wollongong, AAG Community Engagement Award, 2015
University of Wollongong, Alumni Award Social Impact Award, Runner up, 2015
University of Wollongong, Master of Science (Dementia Care), Distinction, 2014
Website Creating life with words: Love, Inspiration and Truth, archived in the PANDORA Collection of the State (SA) and National Library of Australia, 2012
Dementia and the Arts, Also A Mirror, ECH Inc. and Urban Myth Theatre of Youth and Kate Swaffer, South Australia, 2012
Patron for The Visitors, a play about Younger Onset Dementia, Urban Myth Theatre Group and ECH Residential Aged Care, 2012–13
Bachelor of Psychology University Merit Award, University of South Australia, 2008
Lifetime Golden Key Membership, University of South Australia, 2008

Selected Works

References

1958 births
Living people
Australian of the Year Award winners
People from South Australia